Jeremy Taylor (1613–1667) was a clergyman in the Church of England.

Jeremy Taylor may also refer to:

Jeremy Lindsay Taylor (born 1973), Australian actor
Jeremy Taylor (singer) (born 1937), English folk singer and songwriter
Jeremy Taylor (writer), English writer and publisher
Jeremy Taylor (Australian footballer) (born 1992), Australian rules football player
Jeremy Taylor (canoeist), British slalom canoeist
Jeremy Taylor (politician) (born 1978), member of the Iowa House of Representatives
Jeremy Ray Taylor (born 2003), American actor
Jeremy Taylor (dream worker) (born 1943), American dream worker, author and Unitarian Universalist minister

See also
Jerry Taylor (disambiguation)